Joseph Kessler may refer to:

 Josef Alois Kessler (1862–1933), Roman Catholic archbishop
 Joseph Christoph Kessler (1800–1872), German pianist and composer